Tetroncium is a genus of plants in the  Juncaginaceae described as a genus in 1808. It contains only one known species, Tetroncium magellanicum, known from a few sub-Antarctic islands: Tierra Del Fuego (Chile and Argentina), Falkland Islands, and Gough Island. The plant got the name magellanicum because the original description was describing the sample found near the Strait of Magellan.

References

Juncaginaceae
Monotypic Alismatales genera
Flora of South America
Flora of the Falkland Islands
Flora of Gough Island